The Northeastern College is a private, non-sectarian, coeducational secondary and higher education institution located in Santiago City, Philippines. The College offers a range of degrees at both graduate and post-graduate level.

History
The Northeastern College was founded as the Northeastern Institute, in 1941, initially as a high school. It was the first secondary school in the province, and after the first three years, expanded into offering an undergraduate college education.
The Northeastern  Institute, now the Northeastern College was founded in 1941 by educationally-minded citizens, Atty. Francisco E. Pascual, his wife, Doña Emeteria Bautista Pascual, and Mr. Leon Cadaoas who were all residents of Santiago, Isabela.
The Institute, the first to offer secondary education in the province, started with first and second year levels with Doòa Emeteria B. Pascual serving as both classroom teacher and principal.

When World War II broke out in December 1941, its operation was temporarily stopped. Four years later, (August 1945) the school, housed in a rented building on Barangay Dubinan resumed its operation, this time offering complete secondary education.
From 1945 to 1948, enrolment continuously increased prompting the Board of Trustees to approve the construction of a two-storey building on the site where it presently stands.

Inspired with the three years of successful operation, the members of the Board of Trustees conceived the idea of offering a tertiary education to cater to the higher educational needs of its high school graduates. This marked the birth of its college department offering initially the courses Bachelor of Science in Education, Commerce and General Associate in Arts with Mr. Vicente P. Salvador as the first college dean. The opening of the normal course necessitated the opening of a complete elementary education which served as the training ground of its teacher trainees.
On April 25, 1949, the first commencement exercises of the Normal Department of the college was held followed by another one on December 17, 1949. The following years marked not only progress in terms of enrolment but also in education output where most of it graduates find themselves in gainful employment after graduation. The efficient management of the college coupled with effective instruction was the college's greatest investment made in past five decades that more college courses were clamored for by the community.

Today, in response to this clamor, the college now offers fifteen (15) undergraduate courses including the newly offered Bachelor of Science in Nursing and Midwifery Education, Bachelor of Science in Information Technology, Bachelor of Science in Computer Engineering, Bachelor of Arts in Mass Communication, five post graduate studies and six computer short-term courses.
From its humble beginning, NC now stands as one of the formidable educational institutions in the valley as attested by the constant increase in enrolment, regular faculty development, continuous improvement of its educational facilities and its active involvement in the community.

Governance of the College

Board of Directors 
 Lolita B. Albano - Chairman
 Zenaida C. Cabucana - Vice Chairman
 Tomas C. Bautista - President

Academic Council 
 President and Chief Academic Officer: Tomas C. Bautista, Ph.D

Deans 
Dean Madeli R. Bautista, Graduate School
Dean Edmar Cabucana, College of Law
Dean Sabina B. Pascual, College of Liberal Arts
 Dean Clemente P. Claro Jr., College of Business Administration & Accountancy, College of Hotel & Restaurant Management
 Dean Saranay I. Doyaoen, College of Education
 Dean Bonifacio B. Lapat, College of Engineering 
 OIC Mrs. Alpha S. Non, College of Nursing & College of Midwifery
 Dean Loida F. Hermosura, College of Information Technology & Computer Secretarial
 Dean Alfredo T. Assud, College of Criminology

External links

Educational institutions established in 1941
Universities and colleges in Isabela (province)
Education in Santiago, Isabela
1941 establishments in the Philippines